The 2010 Major League Soccer season was the 98th season of FIFA-sanctioned soccer, the 32nd with a national first-division league, in the United States and Canada, and the 15th in MLS history. It began on March 25 at Seattle's Qwest Field with Seattle Sounders FC defeating the expansion Philadelphia Union, 2–0. The 2010 MLS All-Star Game was played at Reliant Stadium, hosted by the Houston Dynamo on July 28 as the MLS XI fell 5–2 to visiting Manchester United. The regular season concluded on October 24, with Los Angeles Galaxy winning the Supporters' Shield by one point over Real Salt Lake. Upon the completion of the regular season the 2010 MLS Cup Playoffs culminated on November 21 with a 2–1 victory by the Colorado Rapids over FC Dallas at Toronto's BMO Field. It was the first time the MLS Cup final was played outside the United States.

The expiration of and failure to sign a new collective bargaining agreement between the league and the players' union threatened the season. Negotiations resulted in a new contract being agreed to on March 20, 2010.

Changes from 2009 
 The players' union and league passed a new collective bargaining agreement that adjusted the players' contracts.
 The Philadelphia Union joined the league as its 16th club and is playing in the Eastern Conference. Their first two home games of the season – against D.C. United April 10 and FC Dallas on May 15 – were played at Lincoln Financial Field while their permanent home, PPL Park in Chester, Pennsylvania, opened with a game against Seattle Sounders FC on June 27.
 A natural grass field replaces the FieldTurf surface at Toronto FC's BMO Field.
 The New York Red Bulls began play in their new stadium Red Bull Arena, defeating the Chicago Fire in the first MLS match played there on March 27 by the score of 1–0.
 Adidas provided their Jabulani match ball with MLS colors of blue and green for the season, as well as new referee kits.
 New Designated Player Rules were agreed upon early in the season:
 Teams can sign two Designated Players, up from one under the previous rules, and pay a "luxury tax" of $250,000 for the right to sign a third Designated Player. The $250,000 would be distributed evenly to all MLS teams that have not signed a third Designated Player in the form of allocation money.
 Each Designated Player counts as $335,000 for the salary cap, down from $415,000 under the previous agreement, and only counts as half that amount if the player is signed during the middle of the season. Teams can use allocation money to reduce the salary cap value of a Designated Player.
 Teams are no longer allowed to trade for additional Designated Player spots, so the New York Red Bulls will receive $70,000 of allocation money in exchange for effectively nullifying their earlier trade with Chivas USA for a second Designated Player spot.
 Teams who have a Designated Player transfer out of the country during the MLS season will recoup a portion of the money spent on the Designated Player.
 Landon Donovan is no longer grandfathered into the agreement, and must be counted as a Designated Player.
 Unlike the previous Designated Player agreement, which was set to expire after three seasons, this agreement has no set expiration date.
 The new Designated Player rule resulted in an explosion of DP signings in 2010, with the league boasting 13 Designated Players at the conclusion of the regular season (Omar Bravo signed with Kansas City in the summer of 2010 but remained with his previous club Guadalajara for the remainder of the season).

Managerial Changes

Personnel 

Note: Flags indicate national team as has been defined under FIFA eligibility rules. Players and Managers may hold more than one non-FIFA nationality.

Collective Bargaining Agreement 

After two extensions to facilitate additional talks, the collective bargaining agreement between the league and the players' union expired February 25, 2010. The league had said that it would not lockout the players. The union had voted in favor of a strike if a new deal was not reached before the beginning of the season. Players were seeking free-agent rights and more guaranteed contracts from the league. On March 20, 2010, MLS and the Players' Union agreed on a new, 5-year collective bargaining agreement that allowed the season to start on time.

Competition format 
The format for the 2010 season was as follows:
 The season began on March 25 and ended on November 21 with MLS Cup 2010.
 The 16 teams were split evenly into two conferences. The Eastern Conference has eight teams with the addition of the Philadelphia Union, and the Western Conference also has eight teams. For the first time in league history, the season had a balanced schedule where each team playing every other team in the league once at home and once away for a total of 30 games.
 Games were not played during the group stage of the 2010 FIFA World Cup. The last MLS game prior to the World Cup was played on June 10, with no games scheduled until after the group stage concluded on June 25.
 The two teams in each conference with the most points qualified for the 2010 MLS Cup Playoffs. In addition, the next four highest ranked teams, regardless of conference, also qualified. Teams were bracketed by conference, with the lowest ranked teams crossing over to the other conference if necessary. In the Conference Semifinals, aggregate goals over two matches determined the winners. The Conference Finals were played as single matches, and the winners advanced to MLS Cup 2010. After the completion of any round, ties will be broken with two 15-minute periods of extra time, followed by a penalty kick shootout if necessary. The away goals rule was not used in any round.
 The team with the most points in the regular season won the MLS Supporters' Shield and qualified directly into the Group Stage of the 2011–12 CONCACAF Champions League. The MLS Cup Winner also qualified for the Champions League Group Stage. The MLS Cup Runners-Up and the 2010 Lamar Hunt U.S. Open Cup winners qualified for the preliminary round of the Champions League. If a team qualifies for multiple berths into the Champions League, then additional berths will be awarded to the highest-placed team(s) in the 2010 MLS regular season's overall standings that have not already qualified.
 The four teams with the most points, regardless of conference, who have not qualified for the Champions League qualified for the SuperLiga 2011.
 The six U.S.-based teams with the most points, regardless of conference, qualified for the third round of the 2011 U.S. Open Cup. The remaining U.S.-based MLS teams had to qualify for the remaining two berths via a series of play-in games.
 As a Canadian-based team, Toronto FC cannot qualify for the Champions League through MLS, and cannot enter the U.S. Open Cup. In either case, any berth in the Champions League or U.S. Open Cup that it would have earned by its league position is awarded to the highest-placed team in the overall standings which has not already qualified. TFC may instead qualify for the Champions League through the Canadian Championship.

Tiebreakers 
 Head-to-Head (Points-per-match average)
 Overall Goal Differential
 Overall Total Goals Scored
 Tiebreakers 1–3 applied only to matches on the road
 Tiebreakers 1–3 applied only to matches at home
 Fewest team disciplinary points in the League Fair Play table
 Coin toss
If more than two clubs are tied, once a club advances through any step, the process reverts to Tiebreaker 1 among the remaining tied clubs recursively until all ties are resolved.

Stadiums

Results table

Standings

Conference standings

Eastern Conference

Western Conference

Overall standings

Playoffs

Statistical leaders 
Full article: MLS Golden Boot
Statistics current as of October 24, 2010

Top scorers (Golden Boot)

Most assists (Silver Boot)

Top goalkeepers

Individual awards

Monthly awards

Weekly awards

Related Competitions

International competitions

CONCACAF Champions League 

The Columbus Crew continued their 2009–10 CONCACAF Champions League campaign that began during the previous season. They were defeated by Mexican club Toluca in the quarterfinals, 5–4 on aggregate.

Seattle Sounders FC became the first team to qualify for the 2010–11 CONCACAF Champions League by winning the 2009 Lamar Hunt U.S. Open Cup. The Columbus Crew qualified next by winning the 2009 MLS Supporters' Shield. The Los Angeles Galaxy and Real Salt Lake also qualified by being the two 2009 MLS Cup finalists, while Toronto FC took the Canadian berth by virtue of their Canadian Championship win. Los Angeles, Seattle, and Toronto entered the competition in the preliminary round, while RSL and Columbus were seeded directly into the group stage.

Seattle and Toronto won their preliminary round ties, beating Isidro Metapán of El Salvador and Motagua of Honduras, respectively. Los Angeles crashed out of the preliminary round after losing their home match 4–1 to the Puerto Rico Islanders of the USSF D-2 Pro League and failing to make up the deficit in the away leg.

The group stage was held August 17 – Oct 21. Real Salt Lake won Group A with 13 points over Cruz Azul, Toronto, and Arabe Unido of Panama. Toronto finished in 3rd place with 8 points. Columbus finished 2nd in Group B behind Club Santos Laguna but ahead of C.S.D. Municipal of Guatemala and Joe Public F.C. of Trinidad. Seattle finished 4th in Group C with 3 points behind C.F. Monterrey, C.D. Saprissa of Costa Rica, and C.D. Marathón of Honduras.

On November 1, the draw for the Championship round was held. Real Salt Lake will face Columbus in the quarterfinal in February/March 2011, immediately prior to the 2011 MLS Regular Season.

SuperLiga 

As was the case for the 2009 SuperLiga, the top four overall finishers in MLS in 2009 that hadn't already qualified for the Champions League qualified for SuperLiga. This year's competition was contested by the Houston Dynamo, the Chicago Fire, Chivas USA, and the New England Revolution from MLS. The four Mexican teams were Pachuca, Morelia, Puebla, and UNAM.

New England, Houston, Morelia and Puebla advanced from their groups, with the Revolution beating Puebla on penalties in one semifinal, and Morelia defeating Houston in the other. Morelia defeated New England 2–1 in the final at Gillette Stadium on September 1.

Domestic competitions

Lamar Hunt U.S. Open Cup 

The top six overall teams from the 2009 MLS season (Columbus, Los Angeles, Houston, Seattle, Chicago, and Chivas USA) received automatic berths into the third round of the 2010 U.S. Open Cup, while the eight remaining U.S.-based MLS teams and the expansion Philadelphia Union competed in a single-elimination qualification tournament to determine the MLS's final two official entrants into the competition. Teams were seeded one through nine, with the seventh-place MLS team from 2009 earning the first seed (and would play the winner of the eight v. nine play-in game), while each following team would receive its respective seed. The New York Red Bulls and D.C. United earned the final two MLS spots in the third round.

For the first time since 2006, the semifinals were contested exclusively by MLS teams, with Seattle beating Chivas USA and Columbus defeating D.C. United. The final was played October 5 at Qwest Field in Seattle with the defending cup holders, the Sounders, defeating the Crew 2–1. The Sounders became the first MLS team ever to successfully defend the U.S. Open Cup, and the first team from any league to do so since New York Pancyprian-Freedoms in 1983.

Canadian championship 

Toronto FC, as a Canadian-based MLS team, is not eligible to compete in the Lamar Hunt U.S. Open Cup, and instead contested the Canadian Championship with the two Canadian-based teams in the Division-2 Pro League, Vancouver Whitecaps and Montreal Impact. Toronto FC won the tournament, claiming the Voyageurs Cup and Canada's entry into the preliminary round of the 2010–11 CONCACAF Champions League.

Coaches

Eastern Conference 
 Chicago Fire: Carlos de los Cobos
 Columbus Crew: Robert Warzycha
 D.C. United: Ben Olsen
 Kansas City Wizards: Peter Vermes
 New England Revolution: Steve Nicol
 New York Red Bulls: Hans Backe
 Philadelphia Union: Peter Nowak
 Toronto FC: Nick Dasovic

Western Conference 
 Chivas USA: Martín Vásquez
 Colorado Rapids: Gary Smith
 FC Dallas: Schellas Hyndman
 Houston Dynamo: Dominic Kinnear
 Los Angeles Galaxy: Bruce Arena
 Portland Timbers: Gavin Wilkinson
 Real Salt Lake: Jason Kreis
 San Jose Earthquakes: Frank Yallop
 Seattle Sounders FC: Sigi Schmid

References

External links 
 Official Site of Major League Soccer
 2010 Major League Soccer season at ESPN

 
2010
1